Østerås is a village in Akershus, Norway. Østerås (station) the west end station of the Oslo Metro line 2, which is also known as the Østerås metro line.

Shopping 
Østerås shopping mall was opened in 1968 and consists of 25 stores and agencies, including grocery store, gym, jewelry, pharmacy, masseuse, doctors office, and dentist.

See also

References

Villages in Akershus